Karol Adamiecki (Dąbrowa Górnicza, 18 March 1866 – 16 May 1933, Warsaw, Poland) was a Polish engineer, management researcher, economist, and professor.

Life

Karol Adamiecki was a prominent management researcher in Eastern and Central Europe. He began his research at the Institute of Technology in St. Petersburg, Russia (1884–90). In 1891 he graduated in engineering from the university in St. Petersburg. He then returned to Dąbrowa Górnicza, where he was in charge of a steel rolling mill.  While working in the steel industry, he developed his ideas on management.

In 1919 he joined the Warsaw Polytechnic as a lecturer, becoming a professor in 1922.  From 1922 he headed the newly established Department of Work Organization and Industrial Enterprises at the Polytechnic's Faculty of Mechanical Engineering. He was the founder and first director (1925–1933) of the Institute of Scientific Organization in Warsaw. He served as vice president of the European Association of Scientific Management.

In 1896 Adamiecki invented a novel means of displaying interdependent processes so as to enhance the visibility of production schedules. In 1903 his theory caused a stir in Russian technical circles. He published some articles on it in the Polish magazine Przegląd Techniczny (Technical Review), nos. 17, 18, 19 and 20 (1909). In 1931 he published a more widely known article describing his diagram, which he called the harmonogram or harmonograf. Adamiecki had, however, published his works in Polish and Russian, languages little known in the English-speaking world. By this time, a similar method had been popularized in the West by Henry Gantt (who had published articles on it in 1910 and 1915). With minor modifications, Adamiecki's chart is now more commonly referred to in English as the Gantt chart.

Adamiecki published his first papers in management in 1898, before Frederick Winslow Taylor had popularized scientific management. In 1925 Adamiecki founded the Polish Institute of Scientific Management.

He did most of his research and observations in the field of metallurgy. 

He is the author of the law of harmony in management: harmony should comprise three parts:
 harmony of choice (all production tools should be mutually compatible, with special regard to their output production speed)
 harmony of doing (the importance of time coordination — schedules and timetables)
 harmony of spirit (the importance of creating a good team)

In 1972 the State College of Economic Administration in Katowice was named after him, and in 1974 it became the Karol Adamiecki University of Economics (Akademia Ekonomiczna im. Karola Adamieckiego w Katowicach).

See also
 List of business theorists
 List of economists
List of Poles

Notes

References

External links

 Important dates in his life and bibliography, in Polish
 The Warsaw University of Technology
 A Biography from the Karol Adamiecki University of Economics

Academic staff of the Warsaw University of Technology
20th-century Polish economists
Polish engineers
Polish business theorists
People from Dąbrowa Górnicza
1866 births
1933 deaths